Ma Zuguang (1928–2003) was a Chinese physicist. He is an expert in optoelectronic technology and professor of Harbin Institute of Technology (HIT). Ma founded two disciplines at HIT, nuclear physics and laser technology. He also founded the Tunable Laser Laboratory, a state-level key laboratory. He was an academician of the Chinese Academy of Sciences.

Ma graduated from Department of Physics, Shandong University in Qingdao in 1950. He later gained postgraduate degree from Harbin Institute of Technology and worked for HIT after graduation.

Personal life
Ma and his wife Sun Yuezhen were classmates at Shandong University. They both became faculty members of Harbin Institute of Technology.

References

1928 births
2003 deaths
Educators from Beijing
Shandong University alumni
Harbin Institute of Technology alumni
Academic staff of Harbin Institute of Technology
Members of the Chinese Academy of Sciences
Physicists from Beijing